The Nuisance is the title of:

The Nuisance (1920 film), a comedy short starring Bartine Burkett
The Nuisance (1921 film), a comedy short featuring Jimmy Aubrey, with Oliver Hardy
The Nuisance (1933 film), a full-length film starring Lee Tracy, Madge Evans and Frank Morgan